Renia nemoralis, the tardy renia or chocolate renia moth, is a litter moth of the family Erebidae. It is found in the US from Illinois to south-eastern Massachusetts south to Florida and Texas. The species was first described by William Barnes and James Halliday McDunnough in 1918.

The wingspan is 28–30 mm. There is one generation per year.

The larvae feed on organic matter, including dead leaves.

External links

Herminiinae
Moths described in 1918